Reeves may refer to:

People 
 Reeves (surname)
 B. Reeves Eason (1886–1956), American director, actor and screenwriter
 Reeves Nelson (born 1991), American basketball player

Places
Ireland
 Reeves, County Kildare, townland in County Kildare

United States
 Reeves, Georgia, unincorporated community
 Reeves, Louisiana, village in Allen Parish
 Reeves County, Texas

Companies and institutions
 House of Reeves, furniture store in Croydon, London, England
Reeves and Sons, English artists' materials firm
Reeves College, college in Alberta, Canada
Reeves Instrument Corporation (RICO), Cold War manufacturer of computer and radar systems for the United States 
 Reeves Pulley Company, transmission and engine manufacturer in Columbus, Indiana founded by Milton Reeves

Ships 
 USS Reeves (DE-94), Buckley-class destroyer escort delivered to the Royal Navy as 
 , Buckley-class destroyer escort launched 1943
 , Leahy-class destroyer leader launched 1962

See also 
 Reeve (disambiguation)
 "The Reeve's Tale", third story told in The Canterbury Tales by Geoffrey Chaucer
 Reeves of Bath, prominent firm of monumental masons (tombstone carvers) in Bath, Somerset that flourished from c. 1778 to the 1860s
 Reeves Field, also known as Reeves Stadium, football stadium located on the campus of Geneva College in Beaver Falls, Pennsylvania
 Reeves House (disambiguation)
 Reeves & Mortimer, British comedy act